The Bernardo Houssay Award is a distinction awarded by Argentina's Ministry of Science, Technology and Productive Innovation to honor outstanding work by scientists and researchers. The Ministry selects recipients annually through a jury of prominent scientists. Presented by the President of Argentina, it is one of the country's most prestigious prizes in the field of science and engineering.

The award's name is a tribute to the doctor Bernardo Houssay, an Argentine Nobel Prize recipient. The Jorge Sabato Award is named in honor of an Argentine technology pioneer, and confers a significant sum of money in addition to a medal.

Distinctions
The Houssay Award is aimed at researchers under the age of 45 who carried out most of their scientific activity in Argentina. It recognizes work in each of four areas: physics, mathematics, and computer science; chemistry, biochemistry and molecular biology; medical sciences; and social sciences (which includes psychology, educational sciences, sociology, law, demography, geography and political science).

The Houssay Career Award is given in the same categories, but to those over 45.

The Jorge Sabato Award (first given in 2013) goes to researchers who excel in technology transfer and developments with economic-productive impact in sectors critical to the country's growth.

The Researcher of the Nation Distinction was instituted in 2009. It is organized by the Ministry of Science, Technology and Productive Innovation through the Secretariat for Planning and Policies in Science, Technology, and Productive Innovation. The winner is selected among the recipients of the other three awards.

The jury is composed of notable national scientific figures, and according to the Minister of Science, Technology and Productive Innovation, Lino Barañao:

Each winner receives a diploma, a medal, and a monetary prize.

In 2010 and 2011, the Rebeca Gerschman Award was also presented to women researchers over 60 years of age, which consisted of a gold medal.

History
The award was created by the national government through Law 25.467, Article 25 in 2001.

It was first presented in 2003 as the "Bernardo Houssay Awards for Scientific-Technological Research". They were given in three categories: Career, Consolidated Researcher, and Young Researcher.

Recipients

Researcher of the Nation

References

External links
 

2003 establishments in Argentina
Argentine awards
Awards established in 2003
Research awards